Bikash Pradhan (born 16 February 1978) is an Indian cricketer. He made his List A debut for Sikkim in the 2018–19 Vijay Hazare Trophy on 20 September 2018.

References

External links
 

1978 births
Living people
Indian cricketers
Sikkim cricketers
Place of birth missing (living people)